Rudwan Khalil Abubaker (1978–2004) was a Canadian independent film actor and amateur model from Vancouver, British Columbia, who was killed by Russian security forces in Chechnya on October 7, 2004.

His family came to Canada from Eritrea as refugees with their four children. Abubaker was accepted into Vancouver Community College to study information technology. A member of the Dar al-Madinah Islamic Society Mosque in Vancouver, He was a "gentle" man who loved soccer and hip hop music. He had just finished the Hajj and visiting relatives in Dubai and was headed to a wedding in Azerbaijan with his friend Kamal Elbahja.

While in Dubai, Abubaker phoned his family to tell them that he was considering staying in the region to open a hip-hop storefront, and that Elbahja was going to head off to Russia.

Abubaker's body was identified by his driver's license and Canadian passport, which showed that he had been to London and Amsterdam. When his family asked for his body, Russia refused stating that it had been buried where he fell. Russia claims he was an explosives expert. His family was represented by lawyer Phil Rankin, who had earlier defended Essam Marzouk during his application for refugee status.

References

1978 births
2004 deaths
Chechen militants
Canadian male film actors
Eritrean refugees
Eritrean emigrants to Canada
Male actors from Vancouver